

List of the most common surnames in Germany 
Data updated to 12 February 2021.

 Müller, occupation (miller)
 Schmidt, occupation (smith)
 Schneider, occupation (tailor)
 Fischer, occupation (fisherman)
 Weber, occupation (weaver)
 Meyer, occupation (originally a manorial landlord, later a self-employed farmer)
 Wagner, occupation (wainwright)
 Becker, occupation (baker)
 Schulz, occupation (medieval mayor)
 Hoffmann, occupation (steward or courtier)
 Schäfer, occupation (shepherd)
 Koch, occupation (cook)
 Bauer, occupation (farmer or peasant)
 Richter, occupation (judge)
 Klein, trait ("small", "short" )
 Wolf, perhaps derived from forename (e.g. Wolf, Wolfgang, etc.) or trait ("wolf-like")
 Schröder, occupation (tailor or wine shipper)
 Neumann, trait ("new")
 Schwarz, trait ("black-haired")
 Zimmermann, occupation (carpenter)
 Braun, trait ("brown-haired") or forename (Brunhold)
 Krüger, occupation (innkeeper)
 Hofmann, occupation (steward or courtier)
 Hartmann, forename
 Lange, trait ("tall")
 Schmitt, occupation (smith)
 Werner, forename
 Schmitz, occupation (smith)
 Krause, trait ("curly haired")
 Meier, occupation (originally a manorial landlord, later a self-employed farmer)
 Lehmann, occupation/class (vassal)
 Schmid, occupation (smith)
 Schulze, occupation (medieval mayor)
 Maier, occupation (originally a manorial landlord, later a self-employed farmer)
 Köhler, occupation (charcoal-maker)
 Herrmann, forename
 König, house name ("king")
 Walter, forename
 Mayer, occupation (originally a manorial landlord, later a self-employed farmer)
 Huber, occupation (farmer)
 Kaiser, house name ("emperor")
 Fuchs, trait ("fox hunter" or "fox-like")
 Peters, forename
 Lang, trait ("tall")
 Scholz, occupation (medieval mayor)
 Möller, occupation (miller)
 Weiß, trait ("white-haired" or "white-skinned")
 Jung, trait ("young")
 Hahn, "rooster", or possibly a condensation of Johannes
 Schubert, occupation (shoemaker), derived from Middle High German Schuochwürhte
 Vogel, house name ("bird")
 Friedrich, forename composed of Old High German fridu ("peace") and rîhhi ("prince")
 Keller, occupation (winemaker)
 Günther, forename
 Frank, tribe (Franks)
 Berger, house name ("mountain")
 Winkler, occupation (grocer)
 Roth, trait ("red-haired")
 Beck, occupation (baker) or house name ("stream")
 Lorenz, forename
 Baumann, occupation (farmer or peasant)
 Franke, tribe (Franks)
 Albrecht, forename
 Schuster, occupation (shoemaker)
 Simon, forename
 Ludwig, forename
 Böhm, nation (Bohemian)
 Winter, related to winter
 Kraus, trait ("curly-haired")
 Martin, forename
 Schumacher, occupation (shoemaker)
 Krämer, occupation (grocer, huckster or chandler)
 Vogt, occupation (bailiff)
 Stein, house name ("rock")
 Jäger, occupation (hunter)
 Otto, forename
 Sommer, related to summer
 Groß, trait ("big")
 Seidel, perhaps derived from forename (e.g. Siegfried, Sieghart, etc.)
 Heinrich, forename
 Brandt, related to fire
 Haas, house name ("hare")
 Schreiber, occupation (scrivener)
 Graf, occupation (count)
 Schulte, occupation (medieval mayor)
 Dietrich, forename composed of Old High German diot ("people") and rihhi ("mighty"), meaning "ruler of people"
 Ziegler, occupation (brickmaker)
 Kuhn, perhaps derived from forename (Konrad)
 Kühn, trait ("brave")
 Pohl, nation, "Pole" "originating from or related to Poland"
 Engel, forename or house name ("angel")
 Horn, house name ("horn")
 Busch, house name ("shrub")
 Bergmann, occupation (miner)
 Thomas, forename
 Voigt, occupation (bailiff)
 Sauer, trait ("grim")
 Arnold, forename
 Wolff, perhaps derived from forename (e.g. Wolf, Wolfgang, etc.) or trait ("wolf-like")
 Pfeiffer, occupation (piper)
 Jeismann,Jeijsman,Jeisman (surname of Wesphalian origin) occupation:Ironman/Ironsmith. Jeismann/Jeisman variant of Eismann=Eisenmann. Dutch Meerten Institute confirms name origin.

Regional differences 
Although Müller is the most common name in German-speaking countries, in some areas other surnames are more frequent than Müller. The common names Schmidt and Schmitz lead in the central German-speaking and eastern Low German-speaking areas. Meyer is particularly common in the Low German-speaking regions, especially in Lower Saxony (where it is more common than Müller). Bauer leads in eastern Upper German-speaking Bavaria. Rarer names tend to accumulate in the north and south. Huber is common in southern Bavaria and is, with the exception of Munich, the most frequent name in that area. Patronymic surnames such as Jansen/Janssen, Hansen, and Petersen are the most common names in the far north (Lower Saxony and Schleswig-Holstein). 
Jeismann/Jeisman, a Westphalian dialect variant of Eiseman/Eisman from Eisenmann.

Slavic names 
Due to the historical settlement of Slavs, Slavic names are most common in Saxony, Brandenburg, and Mecklenburg-Vorpommern (especially in Lusatia, where Sorbs continue to reside today). About 13% of the German population today has names of Slavic origin. Many Austrians also have surnames of Slavic origin.

Polish names in Germany abound as a result of over 100,000 people (including 130,000 "Ruhrpolen") immigrating westward from the Polish-speaking areas of the German Empire. Many Polish-named Germans reside in the Ruhr region of North Rhine-Westphalia and Berlin, though they are mostly "Germanized" by form (e.g. Orlowski, Schimanski, Rudzinski, Kowalski, Schymanietz, Matuzek to Matussek or Mattner, Koslowski, etc.).

 157. Nowak (Polish)
 270. Noack (Sorbian)
 435. Pietsch

Turkish names 
The large number of Turkish immigrants to Germany accounts for the frequency of Turkish surnames.

 587. Yılmaz
 938. Kaya

Names of other origins 
Because many Vietnamese sought asylum in West Germany or guest work in East Germany during and after the Vietnam War, and because approximately 40% of the Vietnamese population carry one particular name, the surname Nguyen is notably common in Germany.

 815. Nguyen

See also 
 German name
 Uffermann

Literature 
 Duden: Familiennamen, Herkunft und Bedeutung von 20.000 Nachnamen. .
 dtv-Atlas: Namenkunde. .
 Hans Bahlow: Deutsches Namenlexikon. München 1967, .
 Max Gottschald: Deutsche Namenkunde. 5. Aufl., Berlin 1982, .
 Josef Karlmann Brechenmacher: Etymologisches Wörterbuch der deutschen Familiennamen. .
 Horst Naumann: Das große Buch der Familiennamen. Alter, Herkunft, Bedeutung. Augsburg 2005, .
 Ernst Schwarz: Deutsche Namenforschung. Band 1: Ruf- und Familiennamen, Band 2: Orts- und Flurnamen, Göttingen 1950.

References 

Jeismann/Jeisman/Jeijsman name origin & meaning
https://www.cbgfamilienamen.nl/nfb/detail_naam.php?gba_naam=Jeijsman&nfd_naam=Jeijsman+%28y%29&info=analyse+en+verklaring&operator=eq&taal=

https://forebears.io/surnames/jeisman#meaning

Surnames in Germany
Germany
Surnames of German origin

zh:常见姓氏列表#德国